Rae Zimmerman is an American engineer, currently at New York University and an Elected Fellow of the American Association for the Advancement of Science.

Education
B.A. in chemistry from the University of California, Berkeley
Master of City Planning from the University of Pennsylvania
Ph.D. in planning from Columbia University

References

Year of birth missing (living people)
Living people
New York University faculty
21st-century American engineers
UC Berkeley College of Chemistry alumni
University of Pennsylvania School of Design alumni
Columbia Graduate School of Architecture, Planning and Preservation alumni
Place of birth missing (living people)
American women engineers
New York University alumni
Fellows of the American Association for the Advancement of Science
American urban planners
Women urban planners
21st-century women engineers
American women academics
21st-century American women